Piotr Bajtlik (born 4 March 1982, Mysłowice) is a professional Polish actor and voiceover talent, living and working in Warsaw, Poland.

Education
2005 – The Aleksander Zelwerowicz National Academy of Dramatic Art in Warsaw – Acting Department

Filmography
Actor
 2005: Na dobre i na złe – Kostek
 2005: Pensjonat pod Różą – Igor
 2007: Pierwsza miłość
 2007: Odwróceni – młody policjant (odc. 7)
 2008: Teraz albo nigdy! – kurier (odc. 14)
 2004–2008: M jak miłość – Adam Leszczyński
 2009: Przeznaczenie – Łukasz, bratanek Edwina
 2010: Plebania – ks. Marek
 2012: Na dobre i na złe – Maciek
 2012: Mika - Łukasz

 TV Theatre
 2008: Pseudonim Anoda – Heniek
 2010: Kolęda Nocka. 30 lat później – Zakochany
 2012: The School for Wives (Molière) – Horace

Dubbing in Polish
 1986: Wielki mysi detektyw – Professor Ratigan
 2001: Dwanaście okrążeń – Rene Cartier
 2003: Świat nonsensów u Stevensów
 2005: Księżniczka na lodzie
 2007: Winx Club: The Secret of the Lost Kingdom– Brandon
 2008: Tatastrofa
 2009: Pokémon: Arceus i Klejnot Życia – Marcus, człowiek przygotowujący jedzenie
 2009: Madagwiazdka
 2009: Barbie and the Three Musketeers – prince Ludwig
 2009: Dzwoneczek i zaginiony skarb – Kamień
 2010: Harriet szpieguje: Wojna blogów – Skander Hill
 2010: Tangled (choir)
 2010: Przyjaciel Świętego Mikołaja
 2010: Liceum Avalon – Marco
 2010: Rio – Nico
 2010: Big Time Rush – Logan
 2010: Przyjaciel świętego Mikołaja
 2012: Journey 2: The Mysterious Island – Sean
 2012: Dzwoneczek i sekret magicznych skrzydeł – Zefir
 2012: Life of Pi – Pi Patel
 2013: Percy Jackson: Sea of Monsters – Percy Jackson
 2013: Epic (2013 film) – Nod
 2013: Teen Beach Movie – Butchy
 2014: The Lego Movie – Emmet
 2014: Rio 2 – Nico
 2014: Teenage Mutant Ninja Turtles – Leonardo
 2014: Bella i Sebastian – Peter
 2015: Flintstonowie: Wielkie Łubu-dubu – John Cenastone
 2015: Dom
 2015: Scooby Doo: Pora księżycowego potwora – Clark Sporkman
 2015: Minionki – Herb O’Haracz (Herb Overkill)
 2015: Teen Beach 2 – Butchy
 2016: Regular Show – Mordechaj
 2016: Pies, który ocalił Wielkanoc – Fred Stein
 2016: Troskliwe Misie: Najlepsi z najlepszych – Śpioszek
 2016: Troskliwe Misie: W blasku gwiazd – Śpioszek
 2016: Batman v Superman: Świt sprawiedliwości
 2016: Alice Through the Looking Glass – James Harcourt
 2016: Wojownicze żółwie ninja: Wyjście z cienia – Leonardo
 2016: Independence Day: Resurgence – Agent Travis
 2016: Wszystkowidząca – Våbenmester
 2016: Pies, który uratował lato – Fred Stein
 2016: Daleko na północy
 2016: Ice Age: Collision Course – Roger
 2016: Powrót na Dziki Zachód – Doc Duvalier
 2016: Sekretne życie zwierzaków domowych
 2016: Pokémon: Hoopa i starcie wszech czasów
 2016: Scooby-Doo i WWE: Potworny wyścig – Stardust
 2016: DC Super Hero Girls: Bohater Roku – Jonathan Kent
 2016: Trolls – Mruk / Branch
 2016: Tellur Aliens – Butch
 2016: Bruno i Bucior: Wskakujcie do basenu – Wilbur Hackenschleimer
 2017: DC Super Hero Girls: Super Hero High –
 Jonathan Kent,
 Hal Jordan
 2017: Transformers: The Last Knight
 2017: Alex i spółka: Jak dorosnąć pod okiem rodziców

Series 
 2007: Bakugan: Młodzi wojownicy – książę Hydron
 2008: Batman: Odważni i bezwzględni –
 Speedy (odc. 34),
 Thaddeus Jr (odc. 36)
 2008: Suite Life: Nie ma to jak statek – Armando (odc. 27)
 2008-2010: Aaron Stone – Trevor (odc. 30)
 2008-2010: Imagination Movers – Smitty
 2009: Ja w kapeli
 2009-2010: Jonas
 2010: Para królów – Jerry (odc. 7)
 2010: Powodzenia, Charlie! – Spencer
 2010: Connor Heath: Szpieg stażysta – Dillon Krug (odc. 5)
 2010: Big Time Rush – Logan
 2010-2014: Zwyczajny serial – Mordechaj
 2011: Beyblade: Metal Masters – Tsubasa Otori
 2011: Jake i piraci z Nibylandii – Pep (piracki dżin)
 2012: Wodogrzmoty Małe
 2012: Totalna Porażka: Zemsta Wyspy – Mike
 2012: MLP:FiM – Garble (odc. 47)
 2012: Supa Strikas: Piłkarskie rozgrywki – North
 2012: Mega Spider-Man –
 Flint Marko / Sandman,
 Hawkeye
 2012: Iron Man: Armored Adventures – Gene Khan/Mandaryn
 2012: Ninjago: Mistrzowie spinjitzu – Darret
 2012: Szczury laboratoryjne – Trent
 2012-2014: Violetta – Marotti
 2012: Klinika dla pluszaków – Jaciążek
 2013: Jeźdźcy smoków – Dagur
 2013: Max Steel – Maxwell McGrath
 2013: Power Rangers Megaforce – Jake Holling
 2013: Avengers: Zjednoczeni – Hawkeye
 2013: Pszczółka Maja –
 Karol,
 Dino
 2014: Totalna Porażka: Plejada gwiazd – Mike
 2014: Głupczaki – mechanik
 2014: Team Hot Wheels –
 Wyatt,
 babcia Wyatta
 2014: Kosmoloty – Kruk
 2014: Akademia tańca – Chris
 2014: Lato w mieście – Boaz
 2015: Małe czarodziejki – tata Hazel
 2015: Blaze and the Monster Machines – Blaze
 2015: Anna i androidy – Wilbert
 2015: Ben 10: Omniverse
 2015: Na końcu świata – Luke
 2015: The Returned – Adam Darrow
 2015: Alicja – dziewczyna Wszechświat —
 Ber,
 Ik
 2016: Totalna Porażka: Wariacki wyścig – Don
 2016: Fresh Beat Band. Kapela detektywów – Twist
 2016: Troskliwe Misie i kuzyni – Dzielny Lew
 2016: K3 – Bob
 2016: Soy Luna – Tino
 2016: Bumble i Gumble – Kloc
 2016: Kulipari: Żabia armia – Burnu
 2017: Garderoba Julie – Spike
 2017: Bunsen, ty bestio! – Tata Mikeya

Roles in National Radio Theatre
 2010: Hamlet W.Shakespeare (directed by W. Modestowicz) – Rosencrantz
 2010: The School for Wives Molière (directed by W. Modestowicz) – Horace
 2010: Wychowanka A.Fredro (directed byH. Rozen) – Pan Piotr
 2010: Moje drzewko pomarańczowe Jose Mauro de Vasconceloso (directed by W. Modestowicz) – Ariovaldo
 2010: Bazuka Dana Łukasińska (directed by W. Modestowicz) – Tiszert
 2010: Księżyc wschodzi J. Iwaszkiewicz (directed by W. Modestowicz) – Jerzy
 2010: Noc. Słowiańsko-germańska tragifarsa medyczna Andrzej Stasiuk (directed by Julia Wernio) – Ciało martwego złodzieja
 2012: The Picture of Dorian Gray Oscar Wilde (directed by W. Modestowicz) – Dorian Gray

Awards 

 2003 - Grand Prix of Anna German's Festival for interpretation of songs
 2018 - Arete - Award for the best debut in National Radio Theatre

References

External links
 
 Piotr Bajtlik @ Dubbingpedia
Piotr Bajtlik's Official Voice Over Website

Polish male film actors
Polish male voice actors
1982 births
Living people